Valtteri Hietanen (born December 23, 1992) is a Finnish professional ice hockey defenceman. He is currently playing for Jukurit of the Finnish Liiga.

Hietanen made his SM-liiga debut playing with JYP Jyväskylä during the 2012–13 SM-liiga season.

References

External links

1992 births
Living people
Finnish ice hockey defencemen
JYP Jyväskylä players
Nikkō Ice Bucks players
People from Virrat
Finnish expatriate ice hockey players in Japan
Sportspeople from Pirkanmaa
21st-century Finnish people